Branden Whitehurst (born November 10, 1989) is a Virgin Islander swimmer. At the 2012 Summer Olympics, he competed in the Men's 100 metre freestyle, finishing in 36th place overall in the heats and failing to qualify for the semifinals. He was born in Orlando, Florida.

References

United States Virgin Islands male freestyle swimmers
1989 births
Living people
Olympic swimmers of the United States Virgin Islands
Swimmers at the 2012 Summer Olympics
Swimmers at the 2011 Pan American Games
Pan American Games competitors for the United States Virgin Islands